Pennypack is a neighborhood in Northeast Philadelphia.  It is located between Northeast Philadelphia Airport and Pennypack Park. 

The Greenbelt Knoll Historic District and Holme Avenue Bridge are listed on the National Register of Historic Places.

References

Neighborhoods in Philadelphia
Northeast Philadelphia